Jonathan Welsh (born June 9, 1982) is a former American football defensive end in the  National Football League. From 2005 to 2007, he played for the Indianapolis Colts.  He attended the University of Wisconsin–Madison and was drafted in the fifth-round (148th overall) by the Colts in the 2005 NFL Draft.

External links
NFL.com player page

1982 births
Living people
Players of American football from Houston
American football defensive ends
Wisconsin Badgers football players
Indianapolis Colts players